The Clémence Isaure fountain (fr: Fontaine Clémence Isaure) is a fountain with a bronze sculpture in Toulouse, France. It represents Clémence Isaure.

History
Its construction was patronized by Octave Sage, a pharmacist, in 1905. It was designed by sculptor Léo Laporte-Blairsy. It was dedicated in 1913.

In 1942, during World War II, the bronze sculpture was removed and hidden to avoid being melted down and turned into weaponry. It was restored after the war.

References

Fountains in France
Buildings and structures completed in 1913
Buildings and structures in Toulouse
20th-century architecture in France